Eupithecia hoenei is a moth in the family Geometridae. It is found in China.

References

Moths described in 1976
hoenei
Moths of Asia